The Bundesliga was founded as the top tier of German football at the start of the 1963–64 season. The following is a list of records attained in the Bundesliga since the league's inception.

Statistics are accurate as of the 2021–22  season.

Club records

Titles

 Highest number of titles won: 31 by Bayern Munich (1968–69, 1971–72, 1972–73, 1973–74, 1979–80, 1980–81, 1984–85, 1985–86, 1986–87, 1988–89, 1989–90, 1993–94, 1996–97, 1998–99, 1999–2000 2000–01, 2002–03, 2004–05, 2005–06, 2007–08, 2009–10, 2012–13, 2013–14, 2014–15, 2015–16, 2016–17, 2017–18, 2018–19, 2019–20, 2020–21, 2021–22)

Champions
 Highest number of games left when becoming champions: 7 by Bayern Munich (2013–14)
 Earliest point of time in a year for a team to be crowned champions: 25 March by Bayern Munich (2013–14)
 Latest point of time in a year for a team to be crowned champions: 28 June by Bayern Munich (1971–72)
 Highest number of matchdays being league leaders: 737 by Bayern Munich
 Highest number of matchdays being league leaders in a season: 34 by Bayern Munich (1968–69, 1972–73, 1984–85, 2007–08 and 2012–13)
 Lowest number of matchdays being league leaders in a season for the champions: 1 by Bayern Munich (1985–86) 
 Lowest number of seasons before becoming champions after being promoted: 1 by 1. FC Kaiserslautern (Promotion: 1997; Champions: 1997–98) 
 Lowest number of seasons before getting relegated for the champions: 1 by 1. FC Nürnberg (Champions: 1967–68; Relegation: 1968–69)

Points
 Highest number of points: 3,924 by Bayern Munich
 Highest number of points in a season: 91 by Bayern Munich (2012–13)
 Highest number of points in a season for a runners-up: 78 by Borussia Dortmund (2015–16)
 Highest number of points in a season opening half: 47 by Bayern Munich (2013–14)
 Highest number of points in a season closing half: 49 by Bayern Munich (2012–13 and 2019–20)
 Highest number of points in a season away: 47 by Bayern Munich (2012–13)
 Highest number of points in a season at home: 49 by Schalke 04 (33:1) (1971–72), Bayern Munich (33:1) (1972–73) and VfL Wolfsburg (2008–09)
 Highest percentage of total possible points in a season: 89.22 by Bayern Munich (2012–13) (91 points out of a possible 102)
 Highest percentage of total possible points in a season opening half: 92.16 by Bayern Munich (2013–14) (47 points out of a possible 51)
 Highest percentage of total possible points in a season closing half: 96.08 by Bayern Munich (2012–13 and 2019–20) (49 points out of a possible 51)
 Highest percentage of total possible points in a season at home: 96.08 by Schalke 04 (1971–72), Bayern Munich (1972–73) and VfL Wolfsburg (2008–09) (49 points out of a possible 51) (Based on 16 wins and a draw with 3 points per win)
 Highest percentage of total possible points in a season away: 92.16 by Bayern Munich (2012–13) (47 points out of a possible 51)
 Biggest lead in points after a season opening half: 11 by Bayern Munich (45) upon VfL Wolfsburg (34) (2014–15)
 Biggest margin of points between champions and runners-up: 25 between Bayern Munich (91) and Borussia Dortmund (66) (2012–13)
 Lowest margin of points between champions and runners-up: 0 points, +3 goal difference between 1. FC Köln (+45) and Borussia Mönchengladbach (+42) (1977–78). Both finished with 48 points.
 Highest percentage of points difference between champions and runners-up: 27.47 between Bayern Munich (91) and Borussia Dortmund (66) (2012–13)
 Highest points per game average: 2.02 by Bayern Munich (3,847 points in 1,908 games)
 Highest points per game average (at least 5 seasons): 2.02 by Bayern Munich (3,847 points in 1,908 games)
 Highest points per game average in a season: 2.68 by Bayern Munich (2012–13)
 Lowest number of points: 10 by Tasmania Berlin
 Lowest number of points in a season: 10 by Tasmania Berlin (8:60) (1965–66)
 Lowest number of points in a season opening half: 4 by Tasmania Berlin (3:31) (1965–66)
 Lowest number of points in a season closing half: 4 by Hannover 96 (4:30) (1985–86)
 Lowest number of points in a season away: 0 by 1. FC Nürnberg (1983–84)
 Lowest number of points in a season at home: 4 by Greuther Fürth (2012–13)
 Highest number of points in a calendar year: 93 by Bayern Munich (2013)
 Highest percentage of total possible points in a calendar year: 93.94 by Bayern Munich (2013) (93 points out of a possible 99)

Wins and losses
 Highest number of wins: 1,168 by Bayern Munich
 Highest number of wins in a season: 29 by Bayern Munich (2012–13 and 2013–14)
 Highest number of wins in a season opening half: 15 by Bayern Munich (2013–14 and 2015–16)
 Highest number of wins in a season closing half: 16 by Bayern Munich (2012–13 and 2019–20)
 Highest number of wins in a season away: 15 by Bayern Munich (2012–13)
 Highest number of wins in a season at home: 16 by Schalke 04 (1971–72), Bayern Munich (1972–73) and VfL Wolfsburg (2008–09)
 Lowest number of losses: 14 by Preußen Münster
 Lowest number of losses in a season: 1 by Bayern Munich (1986–87 and 2012–13)
 Lowest number of losses in a season opening half: 0 by Hamburger SV (1982–83), Bayern Munich (1988–89, 2013–14 and 2014–15), Bayer Leverkusen (2009–10) and 1899 Hoffenheim (2016–17)
 Lowest number of losses in a season closing half: 0 by Eintracht Frankfurt (1976–77), Bayern Munich (1986–87, 2012–13 and 2019–20) and Borussia Dortmund (2011–12)
 Lowest number of losses in a season away: 0 by Bayern Munich (1986–87 and 2012–13)
 Lowest number of losses in a season at home (30 games): 0 by Hamburger SV (1963–64) and Werder Bremen (1964–65)
 Lowest number of losses in a season at home (34 games): 0
 1860 Munich (1965–66)
 Bayern Munich (1970–71 to 1973–74, 1980–81, 1983–84, 1996–97, 1998–99, 2001–02, 2007–08, 2016–17 and 2020–21)
 MSV Duisburg (1970–71)
 Schalke 04 (1970–71)
 Eintracht Frankfurt (1971–72, 1973–74 and 2020–21)
 1. FC Köln (1972–73 and 1987–88)
 Hertha BSC (1974–75 and 1977–78)
 Eintracht Braunschweig (1975–76)
 Hamburger SV (1981–82, 1982–83 and 1995–96)
 1. FC Kaiserslautern (1981–82 and 1994–95)
 Werder Bremen (1982–83, 1984–85, 1985–86 and 1992–93)
 Borussia Mönchengladbach (1983–84)
 Karlsruher SC (1992–93)
 Bayer Leverkusen (1999–2000)
 VfL Wolfsburg (2008–09 and 2014–15)
 Borussia Dortmund (2008–09, 2015–16 and 2016–17)
 Hannover 96 (2011–12) 
 1899 Hoffenheim (2016–17)
 Lowest number of losses in a season at home (38 games): 0 by 1. FC Kaiserslautern (1991–92) and Borussia Dortmund (1991–92)
 Highest number of losses: 678 by Eintracht Frankfurt
 Highest number of losses in a season: 28 by Tasmania Berlin (1965–66)
 Highest number of losses in a season opening half: 15 by Tasmania Berlin (1965–66)
 Highest number of losses in a season closing half: 13 by Tasmania Berlin (1965–66) and FC St. Pauli (1996–97)
 Highest number of losses in a season at home: 13 by Greuther Fürth (2012–13) and Hannover 96 (2015–16)
 Highest number of losses in a season away: 17 by 1. FC Nürnberg (1983–84)
 Lowest number of wins in a season: 2 by Tasmania Berlin (1965–66) and Wuppertaler SV (1974–75)
 Lowest number of wins in a season opening half: 0 by 1. FC Nürnberg (2013–14)
 Lowest number of wins in a season closing half: 0 by Wuppertaler SV (1974–75) and Hannover 96 (1985–86)
 Lowest number of wins in a season at home: 0 by Greuther Fürth (2012–13)
 Lowest number of wins in a season away: 0 
 Tasmania Berlin (1965–66)
 Karlsruher SC (1965–66, 1967–68 and 1976–77)
 Borussia Neunkirchen (1967–68) 
 Borussia Dortmund (1967–68 and 1978–79)
 Hannover 96 (1969–70, 1971–72 and 2018–19)
 Alemannia Aachen (1969–70)
 Arminia Bielefeld (1971–72)
 Rot-Weiß Oberhausen (1972–73)
 Hertha BSC (1972–73 and 1982–83) 
 Wuppertaler SV (1974–75)
 VfB Stuttgart (1974–75 and 2000–01)
 VfL Bochum (1975–76)
 Tennis Borussia Berlin (1976–77)
 Rot-Weiss Essen (1976–77)
 Bayern Munich (1977–78)
 Eintracht Braunschweig (1979–80) 
 Bayer 05 Uerdingen (1980–81)
 Fortuna Düsseldorf (1981–82)
 MSV Duisburg (1981–82)
 1. FC Nürnberg (1983–84 and 2018–19)
 Kickers Offenbach (1983–84)
 Eintracht Frankfurt (1986–87 and 1995–96)
 FC 08 Homburg (1986–87)
 SV Waldhof Mannheim (1986–87)
 FC St. Pauli (1988–89 and 2001–02)
 Dynamo Dresden (1992–93)
 SG Wattenscheid 09 (1993–94)
 Borussia Mönchengladbach (1998–99 and 2004–05)
 1. FC Köln (2003–04)
 SC Freiburg (2003–04)
 Schalke 04 (2020–21) 
 Greuther Fürth (2021–22)
 Highest winning percentage: 60.14 by Bayern Munich (1,168 wins in 1,942 games)
 Highest winning percentage (at least 5 seasons): 60.14 by Bayern Munich (1,168 wins in 1,942 games)
 Highest losing percentage: 82.35 by Tasmania Berlin (28 losses in 34 games)
 Highest percentage of wins in a season: 85.29 by Bayern Munich (2012–13 and 2013–14) (29 wins in 34 games)
 Highest percentage of wins in a season opening half: 88.24 by Bayern Munich (2013–14 and 2015–16) (15 wins in 17 games)
 Highest percentage of wins in a season closing half: 94.12 by Bayern Munich (2012–13 and 2019–20) (16 wins in 17 games)
 Highest number of wins in a debut season: 20 by Bayern Munich (1965–66) and RB Leipzig (2016–17)
 Highest number of wins in a calendar year: 30 by Bayern Munich (2013)
 Highest percentage of wins in a calendar year: 90.90 by Bayern Munich (2013) (30 wins in 33 games)
 Lowest number of losses in a calendar year: 0 by Bayern Munich (2013)

Goals
 Highest number of goals scored: 4,329 by Bayern Munich
 Highest number of goals scored in a season: 101 by Bayern Munich (1971–72)
 Highest number of goals scored in a season opening half: 56 by Bayern Munich (2021–22)
 Highest number of goals scored in a season closing half: 54 by Bayern Munich (1971–72, 2012–13 and 2019–20)
 Highest number of goals scored in a season at home: 69 by Bayern Munich (1971–72)
 Highest number of goals scored in a season away: 47 by Bayern Munich (2019–20)
 Lowest number of conceded goals: 52 by Preußen Münster
 Lowest number of conceded goals in a season: 17 by Bayern Munich (2015–16)
 Lowest number of conceded goals in a season away: 7 by Bayern Munich (2012–13)
 Lowest number of conceded goals in a season at home: 5 by Werder Bremen (1992–93)
 Lowest number of conceded goals in a season opening half:  4 by Bayern Munich (2014–15)
 Lowest number of conceded goals in a season closing half: 9 by Bayern Munich (2015–16)
 Best goal difference: +2,215 by Bayern Munich
 Best goal difference in a season: +80 by Bayern Munich (2012–13)
 Best goal difference in a season away: +38 by Bayern Munich (2013–14)
 Best goal difference in a season at home: +49 by Bayern Munich (1972–73)
 Best goal difference in a season opening half: +40 by Bayern Munich (2021–22)
 Best goal difference in a season closing half: +44 by Bayern Munich (2019–20)
 Lowest number of goals scored: 15 by Tasmania Berlin
 Lowest number of goals scored in a season: 15 by Tasmania Berlin (1965–66)
 Lowest number of goals scored in a season away: 7 by Tasmania Berlin (1965–66)
 Lowest number of goals scored in a season at home: 8 by Tasmania Berlin (1965–66)
 Lowest number of goals scored in a season opening half: 8 by Tasmania Berlin (1965–66) and Eintracht Frankfurt (1988–89)
 Lowest number of goals scored in a season closing half: 7 by Tasmania Berlin (1965–66)
 Highest number of conceded goals: 2,835 by Werder Bremen
 Highest number of conceded goals in a season: 108 by Tasmania Berlin (1965–66)
 Highest number of conceded goals in a season away: 70 by Kickers Offenbach (1983–84)
 Highest number of conceded goals in a season at home: 46 by Tasmania Berlin (1965–66)
 Highest number of conceded goals in a season opening half: 58 by Tasmania Berlin (1965–66)
 Highest number of conceded goals in a season closing half: 53 by Kickers Offenbach and Fortuna Düsseldorf (both 1983–84)
 Worst goal difference: −366 by 1. FC Nürnberg
 Worst goal difference in a season: −93 by Tasmania Berlin (1965–66)
 Worst goal difference in a season away: −55 by Tasmania Berlin (1965–66) and Kickers Offenbach (1983–84)
 Worst goal difference in a season at home: −38 by Tasmania Berlin (1965–66)
 Worst goal difference in a season opening half: −50 by Tasmania Berlin (1965–66)
 Worst goal difference in a season closing half: −43 by Tasmania Berlin (1965–66)
 Scoring in every game of the season (30 games): 1. FC Köln (1963–64)
 Scoring in every game of the season (34 games): Bayern Munich (2012–13, 2020–21 and 2021–22)
 Highest number of clean sheets in a season: 22 by Bayern Munich (2014–15)
 Highest number of clean sheets in a season opening half: 13 by Bayern Munich (2014–15)
 Highest number of clean sheets in a season away: 12 by Bayern Munich (2012–13)
 Highest number of wins with a clean sheet in a season: 21 by Bayern Munich (2012–13)
 Highest number of wins with at least 2 goals up in a season: 23 by Bayern Munich (2012–13)
 Biggest loss at home: 0–9 by Tasmania Berlin against MSV Duisburg (matchday 27 of 1965–66)
 Biggest win at home: 12–0 by Borussia Mönchengladbach against Borussia Dortmund (matchday 34 of 1977–78)
 Highest number of goalless draws in a season: 9 by 1. FC Köln (2014–15)
 Lowest number of touches in a game before a goal by the scoring team: 1 by 1899 Hoffenheim (matchday 2 of 2015–16)
 Lowest number of shots on goal in a game by one team: 0 by Werder Bremen (matchday 8 of 2014–15)

Runs
 Highest number of consecutive seasons in the Bundesliga: 58 by Bayern Munich
 Highest number of consecutive seasons in the Bundesliga since the start of the league: 55 by Hamburger SV
 Highest number of consecutive titles: 10 by Bayern Munich (2012–13 to 2021–22) (ongoing)
 Highest number of consecutive wins: 19 by Bayern Munich (matchday 9 to 27 of 2013–14)
 Highest number of consecutive wins in a season: 19 by Bayern Munich (matchday 9 to 27 of 2013–14)
 Highest number of consecutive wins in a debut season: 8 by RB Leipzig (matchday 6 to 13 of 2016–17)
 Highest number of consecutive wins from start of the season: 10 by Bayern Munich (2015–16)
 Highest number of consecutive wins from start of the season closing half: 14 by Bayern Munich (2012–13)
 Highest number of consecutive wins away: 11 by Bayern Munich (matchday 12 to 34 of 2019–20)
 Highest number of consecutive wins at home: 26 by Bayern Munich (matchday 16 of 1971–72 to matchday 32 of 1972–73)
 Highest number of consecutive wins at home in a season: 16 by Bayern Munich (matchday 2 to 32 of 1972–73)
 Highest number of consecutive wins at home from start of the season: 16 by Bayern Munich (1972–73)
 Highest number of consecutive games unbeaten: 53 by Bayern Munich (matchday 10 of 2012–13 to matchday 28 of 2013–14)
 Highest number of consecutive games unbeaten in a season: 28 by Borussia Dortmund (matchday 7 to 34 of 2011–12) and Bayern Munich (matchday 1 to 28 of 2013–14)
 Highest number of consecutive games unbeaten from start of the season: 28 by Bayern Munich (2013–14)
 Highest number of consecutive games unbeaten from start of the season closing half: 17 by Eintracht Frankfurt (1976–77), Bayern Munich (1986–87, 2012–13 and 2019–20) and Borussia Dortmund (2011–12)
 Highest number of consecutive games unbeaten from debut: 13 by RB Leipzig (2016–17)
 Highest number of consecutive games unbeaten away: 33 by Bayern Munich (matchday 32 of 2011–12 to matchday 27 of 2013–14)
 Highest number of consecutive games unbeaten at home: 73 by Bayern Munich (matchday 31 of 1969–70 to matchday 4 of 1974–75)
 Highest number of consecutive games unbeaten in season opening halves: 56 by Bayern Munich (matchday 10 of 2012–13 to matchday 14 of 2015–16)
 Highest number of consecutive games scoring at least one goal: 65 by Bayern Munich (matchday 32 of 2011–12 to matchday 28 of 2013–14)
 Highest number of consecutive games scoring at least one goal from debut: 14 by Wuppertaler SV (1974–75)
 Highest number of consecutive games scoring at least two goals: 20 by Bayern Munich (matchday 11 to 28 of 2013–14)
 Highest number of consecutive games scoring at least one goal away: 49 by Bayern Munich (matchday 2 of 2019–20 to matchday 30 of 2021–22) (ongoing)
 Highest number of consecutive games scoring at least one goal at home: 64 by Bayern Munich (matchday 13 of 1970–71 to matchday 4 of 1974–75)
 Highest number of consecutive games scoring at least one goal in a season: 34 by Bayern Munich (2012–13 and 2020–21)
 Highest number of consecutive wins with a clean sheet away: 6 by Bayern Munich (matchday 14 to 24 of 2012–13)
 Highest number of consecutive wins with a clean sheet away from start of the season: 5 by Bayern Munich (2012–13)
 Highest number of consecutive games with a clean sheet: 9 by VfB Stuttgart (matchday 34 of 2002–03 to matchday 8 of 2003–04)
 Highest number of consecutive games with a clean sheet in a season: 8 by VfB Stuttgart (matchday 1 to 8 of 2003–04)
 Highest number of consecutive games with a clean sheet from start of the season: 8 by VfB Stuttgart (2003–04)
 Highest number of consecutive games with a clean sheet at home: 9 by VfL Bochum (matchday 8 to 24 of 2003–04)
 Highest number of consecutive games with a clean sheet away: 6 by 1. FC Köln (matchday 6 to 16 of 2009–10) and Bayern Munich (matchday 14 to 24 of 2012–13 and matchday 4 to 15 of 2014–15)
 Highest number of consecutive minutes without conceding: 884 by VfB Stuttgart (minute 76 of matchday 33 of 2002–03 to minute 59 of matchday 9 of 2003–04)
 Highest number of consecutive minutes without conceding away: 658 by Bayern Munich (from minute 46 of matchday 12 to minute 75 of matchday 26 of 2012–13)
 Highest number of consecutive games without a win: 31 by Tasmania Berlin (matchday 2 to 32 of 1965–66)
 Highest number of consecutive games without a win from start of the season: 17 by 1. FC Nürnberg (2013–14)
 Highest number of consecutive games without a win from start of the season closing half: 17 by Wuppertaler SV (1974–75) and Hannover 96 (1985–86)
 Highest number of consecutive games without a win away: 36 by FC Schalke 04 (matchday 12 of 2019–20 to matchday 16 of 2022–23)
 Highest number of consecutive games without a win at home: 23 by Greuther Fürth (matchday 1 to 33 of 2012–13 and matchday 2 to 13 of 2021–22)
 Highest number of consecutive games losing: 12 by Greuther Fürth (matchday 3 to 14 of 2021–22)
 Highest number of consecutive games losing in a season: 10 by Tasmania Berlin (matchday 9 to 18 of 1965–66), 1. FC Nürnberg (matchday 25 to 34 of 1983–84) and Arminia Bielefeld (matchday 12 to 21 of 1999–2000)
 Highest number of consecutive games losing from start of the season: 6 by Fortuna Düsseldorf (1991–92) and Mainz 05 (2020–21)
 Highest number of consecutive games losing from start of the season closing half: 7 by Hannover 96 (2009–10) 
 Highest number of consecutive games losing away: 29 by 1. FC Nürnberg (matchday 11 of 1982–83 to matchday 34 of 1983–84)
 Highest number of consecutive games losing at home: 8 by Tasmania Berlin (matchday 3 to 17 of 1965–66) and FC Hansa Rostock (matchday 2 to 15 of 2004–05)
 Highest number of consecutive games losing at home from start of the (home) season: 8 by FC Hansa Rostock (2004–05)
 Highest number of consecutive games without scoring: 10 by 1. FC Köln (matchday 15 to 24 of 2001–02)
 Highest number of consecutive minutes without scoring: 1,033 by 1. FC Köln (from minute 31 of matchday 14 to minute 74 of matchday 25 of 2001–02)
 Highest number of consecutive games without scoring from start of the season: 5 by VfL Bochum (1979–80) and Hamburger SV (2014–15)
 Highest number of consecutive minutes without scoring from start of the season: 507 by Hamburger SV (from minute 1 of matchday 1 to minute 57 of matchday 6 of 2014–15)
 Highest number of consecutive seasons with all games sold out: 10 by Bayern Munich (2007–08 to 2016–17) 
 Highest number of consecutive seasons with all home games sold out: 12 by Bayern Munich (2007–08 to 2018–19)
 Highest number of consecutive seasons with all away games sold out: 11 by Bayern Munich (2006–07 to 2016–17)
 Highest number of consecutive seasons with at least one sold out game: 52 by Bayern Munich (1968–69 to 2019–20)
 Highest number of consecutive seasons with at least one sold out home game: 37 by Bayern Munich (1983–84 to 2019–20)
 Highest number of consecutive seasons with at least one sold out away game: 52 by Bayern Munich (1968–69 to 2019–20)
 Highest number of consecutive sold out games: 361 by Bayern Munich (matchday 20 of 2006–07 to matchday 6 of 2017–18)
 Highest number of consecutive sold out home games: 224 by Bayern Munich (matchday 21 of 2006–07 to matchday 25 of 2019–20)
 Highest number of consecutive sold out away games: 196 by Bayern Munich (matchday 22 of 2005–06 to matchday 5 of 2017–18)
 Highest number of consecutive games unbeaten in a calendar year: 33 by Bayern Munich (2013) (30 wins and 3 draws)

Participations
 Highest number of seasons in the Bundesliga: 58 by Bayern Munich and Werder Bremen
 Highest percentage of possible seasons in the Bundesliga: 96.6 by Bayern Munich and Werder Bremen
 Lowest number of relegations since the debut in the Bundesliga: 0 by Bayern Munich (since 1965–66), Bayer Leverkusen (since 1979–80), VfL Wolfsburg (since 1997–98), 1899 Hoffenheim (since 2008–09), FC Augsburg (since 2011–12), RB Leipzig (since 2016–17) and Union Berlin (since 2019–20)
 Lowest number of seasons in the Bundesliga since the league debut: 1 by Preußen Münster (1963–64), Tasmania 1900 Berlin (1965–66), Fortuna Köln (1973–74), Blau-Weiß Berlin (1986–87), VfB Leipzig (1993–94), SSV Ulm 1846 (1999–2000)
 Highest number of promotions to the Bundesliga: 8 by Arminia Bielefeld (1970, 1978, 1980, 1996, 1999, 2002, 2004 and 2020) and 1. FC Nürnberg (1978, 1980, 1985, 1998, 2001, 2004, 2009 and 2018)
 Highest number of relegations from the Bundesliga: 9 by 1. FC Nürnberg (1968–69, 1978–79, 1983–84, 1993–94, 1998–99, 2002–03, 2007–08, 2013–14 and 2018–19)

Attendances
 All-time highest home attendance: 44,795,770 by Borussia Dortmund 
 All-time highest home attendance per game: 48,903 by Borussia Dortmund (in 916 Home games)
 Highest attendance in a season at home: 1,381,700 by Borussia Dortmund (2015–16)
 Highest average attendance per home game in a season: 81,226 by Borussia Dortmund (2015–16)
 Highest percentage of possible attendance in a home season: 100 by SC Freiburg (1995–96 and 2016–17), 1. FC Kaiserslautern (1997–98), Bayer Leverkusen (2002–03 to 2004–05), Mainz 05 (2004–05) and Bayern Munich (2005–06 and 2007–08 to 2018–19)
 Highest percentage of possible attendance in an away season: 100 by Bayern Munich (1999–2000, 2000–01, 2003–04, 2004–05, 2006–07 to 2016–17 and 2018–19)
 Highest percentage of possible attendance in a season: 100 by Bayern Munich (2007–08 to 2016–17 and 2018–19)
 Highest number of seasons with all games sold out: 11 by Bayern Munich (2007–08 to 2016–17 and 2018–19)
 Highest number of seasons with all home games sold out: 13 by Bayern Munich (2005–06 and 2007–08 to 2018–19) 
 Highest number of seasons with all away games sold out: 16 by Bayern Munich (1999–2000, 2000–01, 2003–04, 2004–05, 2006–07 to 2016–17 and 2018–19)
 Highest number of seasons with at least one sold out game: 55 by Bayern Munich (1965–66, 1966–67, 1968–69 to 2019–20 and 2021–22)
 Highest number of seasons with at least one sold out game away: 54 by Bayern Munich (1965–66, 1966–67 and 1968–69 to 2019–20)
 Highest number of seasons with at least one sold out game at home: 50 by Bayern Munich (1965–66, 1966–67, 1970–71, 1972–73, 1974–75 to 1981–82, 1983–84 to 2019–20 and 2021–22)

 Highest number of sold out games: 792 by Bayern Munich
 Highest number of sold out games away: 474 by Bayern Munich
 Highest number of sold out games at home: 318 by Bayern Munich
 Highest percentage of sold out games: 57.14 by RB Leipzig (16 out of 28)
 Highest percentage of sold out games (at least 5 seasons): 44.85 by Bayern Munich (792 out of 1,766)
 Highest percentage of sold out home games: 71.43 by RB Leipzig (10 out of 14)
 Highest percentage of sold out home games (at least 5 seasons): 55.19 by Mainz 05 (101 out of 183)
 Highest percentage of sold out away games: 53.68 by Bayern Munich (474 out of 883)

Player and manager records
Bold names are of those, who are currently active in the Bundeliga (in the respective category, which their records are relevant to).
For example: A player only, if he is still playing and not, if he is, for example, coaching at the moment.

Appearances

 Highest number of as a player and coach combined: 1,038 by Jupp Heynckes  (as a player: 369 (1965 to 1967, 1970 to 1978 for Borussia Mönchengladbach, 1967 to 1970 for Hannover 96) and as a coach: 669 (1978 to 1987, 2006 to 2007 for Borussia Mönchengladbach; 1987 to 1991, 2009, 2011 to 2013, 2017 to 2018 for Bayern Munich; 1994 to 1995 for Eintracht Frankfurt; 2003 to 2004 for FC Schalke 04; 2009 to 2011 for Bayer Leverkusen)
 Highest number of appearances as a coach: 836 by Otto Rehhagel (1974 to 2000 and 2012) 
 Highest number of appearances as a player: 602 by Charly Körbel (1972–73 to 1990–91) (93.19% of the possible 646 games)
 Highest number of appearances for one club overall: 741 by Thomas Schaaf (1979 and 1982 to 1993–94 and 1999 to 2013) for Werder Bremen
 Highest number of appearances for one club as a player and coach combined: 741 by Thomas Schaaf (as a player: 1979 and 1982 to 1993–94 and as a coach 1999 to 2013) for Werder Bremen
 Highest number of appearances as a coach for one club: 493 by Otto Rehhagel for Werder Bremen (1976 and 1981–82 to 1994–95)
 Highest number of appearances as a player for one club: 602 by Charly Körbel for Eintracht Frankfurt (1972–73 to 1990–91)
 Highest number of appearances as a player for one club having not played for another club: 602 by Charly Körbel for Eintracht Frankfurt (1972–73 to 1990–91)
 Highest number of appearances for a foreign player: 490 by Claudio Pizarro for Werder Bremen, Bayern Munich and 1. FC Köln (1999 to 2007 and 2008 to 2020)
 Youngest age for a player to appear: 16 years and 1 day by Youssoufa Moukoko for Borussia Dortmund (matchday 8 of 2020–21)
 Oldest age for a player to appear: 43 years and 184 days by Klaus Fichtel for Schalke 04 (matchday 34 of 1987–88)
 Youngest age for a coach to appear: 24 years and 47 days by Bernd Stöber for 1. FC Saarbrücken (matchday 10 of 1976–77)
 Youngest age for a coach to appear (appointed as head coach): 28 years and 205 days by Julian Nagelsmann for 1899 Hoffenheim (matchday 21 of 2015–16)
 Oldest age for a coach to appear: 74 years and 184 days by Alfred Schulz for Werder Bremen (matchday 34 of 1977–78)
 Oldest age for a player making his debut appearance: 38 years and 171 days by Richard Kress for Eintracht Frankfurt (matchday 1 of 1963–64)
 Oldest age for a coach making his debut appearance: 60 years and 36 days by Willi Multhaup for Werder Bremen (matchday 1 of 1963–64)
 Highest number of seasons with all games played: 13 by Sepp Maier of Bayern Munich (1966–67 to 1978–79)
 Highest number of seasons with all games played for one club: 13 by Sepp Maier of Bayern Munich (1966–67 to 1978–79)
 Highest number of seasons with all games played for one club, having not played for another club: 13 by Sepp Maier of Bayern Munich (1966–67 to 1978–79)
 Highest number of seasons overall: 37 by Otto Rehhagel (1963–64 to 1964–65 and 2012 for Hertha BSC, 1966–67 to 1971 and 1997–98 to 2000 for 1. FC Kaiserslautern, 1974 to 1975 for Kickers Offenbach, 1976 and 1981–82 to 1994–95 for Werder Bremen, 1976–77 to 1977–78 for Borussia Dortmund, 1978 to 1979 for Arminia Bielefeld, 1979 to 1980 for Fortuna Düsseldorf and 1995 to 1996 for Bayern Munich)
 Highest number of seasons as a player and coach combined: 37 by Otto Rehhagel (as a player for: Hertha BSC (1963–64 to 1964–65) and 1. FC Kaiserslautern (1966–67 to 1971) and as a coach for: Kickers Offenbach (1974 to 1975), Werder Bremen (1976 and 1981–82 to 1994–95), Borussia Dortmund (1976–77 to 1977–78), Arminia Bielefeld (1978–1979), Fortuna Düsseldorf (1979 to 1980), Bayern Munich (1995 to 1996), 1. FC Kaiserslautern (1997–98 to 2000) and Hertha BSC (2012))
 Highest number of seasons as a player: 22 by Klaus Fichtel (1965–66 to 1987–88)
 Highest number of seasons as a player for one club: 19 by Klaus Fichtel (1965–66 to 1979–80 and 1984–85 to 1987–88) for Schalke 04, Manfred Kaltz for Hamburger SV (1971–72 to 1988–89 and 1990–91) and Charly Körbel for Eintracht Frankfurt (1972–73 to 1990–91)
 Highest number of seasons as a player for one club having not played for another club: 19 by Charly Körbel for Eintracht Frankfurt (1972–73 to 1990–91)
 Highest number of seasons as a coach: 29 by Otto Rehhagel for Kickers Offenbach (1974 to 1975), Werder Bremen (1976 and 1981–82 to 1994–95), Borussia Dortmund (1976–77 to 1977–78), Arminia Bielefeld (1978 to 1979), Fortuna Düsseldorf (1979 to 1980), Bayern Munich (1995–1996), 1. FC Kaiserslautern (1997–98 to 2000) and Hertha BSC (2012))
 Highest number of seasons for one club overall: 30 by Thomas Schaaf (1979 and 1982 to 1993–94 and 1999 to 2013) for Werder Bremen
 Highest number of seasons for one club as a player and coach combined: 30 by Thomas Schaaf (as a player: 1979 and 1982 to 1993–94 and as a coach: 1999 to 2013) for Werder Bremen
 Highest number of seasons as a coach for one club: 15 by Otto Rehhagel (1976 and 1981–82 to 1994–95) and Thomas Schaaf (1999 to 2013) both for Werder Bremen
 Highest number of different clubs coached: 8 by Jörg Berger (Fortuna Düsseldorf (1981 to 1982), Hannover 96 (1986), Eintracht Frankfurt (1989–90 to 1991 and 1999), 1. FC Köln (1991 to 1993), Schalke 04 (1993 to 1996), Karlsruher SC (1998), Hansa Rostock (2004 to 2005) and Arminia Bielefeld (2009)) and Otto Rehhagel (Kickers Offenbach (1974 to 1975), Werder Bremen (1976 and 1981–82 to 1994–95), Borussia Dortmund (1976–77 to 1977–78), Arminia Bielefeld (1978 to 1979), Fortuna Düsseldorf (1979 to 1980), Bayern Munich (1995 to 1996), 1. FC Kaiserslautern (1997–98 to 2000) and Hertha BSC (2012))
 Highest number of different clubs played for: 7 by Michael Spies (1986 for VfB Stuttgart, 1987–88 to 1988–89 for Karlsruher SC, 1989–90 to 1990–91 for Borussia Mönchengladbach, 1991–92 for Hansa Rostock, 1992–93 to 1993–94 for Hamburger SV, 1994–95 for Dynamo Dresden and 1997–98 for VfL Wolfsburg)
 Highest number of substitutions onto the field: 123 by Mehmet Scholl (1990–2007)
 Highest number of substitutions from the field: 139 by Gerald Asamoah (1999–2010)
 Highest number of substitutions from the field in a season: 29 by Patrick Herrmann (2013–14)
 Highest number of different players fielded in a season: 36 by Felix Magath (VfL Wolfsburg) (2011–12)
 Lowest number of days as a coach before being sacked: 18 by Robert Körner (from 25 March to 12 April 1969 at 1. FC Nürnberg)
 Youngest age for a player to reach 100 appearances: 20 years and 203 days by Timo Werner for VfB Stuttgart and RB Leipzig (matchday 5 of 2016–17)
 Most coaches for one club in a season: 5 for Kickers Offenbach (1970–71), MSV Duisburg (1977–78) and Schalke 04 (2020–21)

Goals

 Highest number of goals scored: 365 by Gerd Müller
 Highest number of goals scored at home: 250 by Gerd Müller
 Highest number of goals scored away: 126 by Robert Lewandowski
 Highest number of goals scored for one club: 365 by Gerd Müller for Bayern Munich
 Highest number of goals scored for one club, playing for no other club: 365 by Gerd Müller for Bayern Munich
 Highest number of goals scored in a season: 41 by Robert Lewandowski for Bayern Munich (2020–21)
 Highest number of goals scored in a season at home: 27 by Gerd Müller (1972–73) and Robert Lewandowski (2020–21), both for Bayern Munich
 Highest number of goals scored in a season away: 19 by Robert Lewandowski (2021–22)
 Highest number of goals scored in the first half of a season: 22 by Robert Lewandowski (2020–21)
 Highest number of goals scored in the closing half of a season: 23 by Gerd Müller (1971–72)
 Highest number of goals scored in a calendar year: 43 by Robert Lewandowski (2021)
 Highest number of goals scored in a game: 6 by Dieter Müller for 1. FC Köln (matchday 3 of 1977–78)
 Highest number of goals scored in a game by a substitute: 5 by Robert Lewandowski for Bayern Munich (matchday 6 of 2015–16)
 Highest number of goals scored in first 100 appearances: 72 by Friedhelm Konietzka for Borussia Dortmund and 1860 Munich (from 1963–64 to 1966–67)
 Highest number of Top Scorer awards: 7 by Gerd Müller for Bayern Munich (1966–67, 1968–69, 1969–70, 1971–72 to 1973–74 and 1977–78) and Robert Lewandowski for Borussia Dortmund (2013–14) and Bayern Munich (2015–16 and 2017–18 to 2021–22)
 Highest number of goals scored by a foreign player: 312 by Robert Lewandowski for Borussia Dortmund and Bayern Munich (2010 to 2014 and 2014 to 2022)
 Highest number of goals scored by a foreign player in a season: 41 by Robert Lewandowski for Bayern Munich (2020–21)
 Shortest elapsed timespan before a goal scored: 9 seconds by: Karim Bellarabi for Bayer Leverkusen (matchday 1 of 2014–15) and Kevin Volland for 1899 Hoffenheim (matchday 2 of 2015–16)
 Shortest elapsed timespan before a goal scored with the opposition kicking off: 9 seconds by Kevin Volland for 1899 Hoffenheim (matchday 2 of 2015–16)
 Shortest elapsed timespan before a goal scored by a debutant: 17 seconds by Miloš Jojić for Borussia Dortmund (2013–14)
 Shortest elapsed timespan before a goal scored by a substitute: 13 seconds by Uwe Wassmer for SC Freiburg (1996–97)
 Shortest elapsed timespan until a scored hat-trick: 4 minutes by Robert Lewandowski for Bayern Munich (between minute 51 and 55 of matchday 6 of 2015–16)
 Shortest elapsed timespan until four goals scored: 6 minutes by Robert Lewandowski for Bayern Munich (between minute 51 and 57 of matchday 6 of 2015–16)
 Shortest elapsed timespan until five goals scored: 9 minutes by Robert Lewandowski for Bayern Munich (between minute 51 and 60 of matchday 6 of 2015–16)
 Youngest goalscorer: Youssoufa Moukoko for Borussia Dortmund at 16 years and 28 days (matchday 13 of 2020–21)
 Oldest goalscorer: Claudio Pizarro for Werder Bremen at 40 years and 227 days (matchday 34 of 2018–19)
 Highest number of penalties scored: 53 by Manfred Kaltz (from 60 attempts)
 Highest number of goals scored by a goalkeeper: 26 by Hans-Jörg Butt (all penalties)
 Highest number of goals scored by a goalkeeper from open play: 1 by Jens Lehmann for Schalke 04 (matchday 20 of 1997–98), Frank Rost for Werder Bremen (matchday 29 of 2001–02) and Marwin Hitz for FC Augsburg (matchday 22 of 2014–15)
 Highest number of games without scoring before first goal: 266 by Dietmar Schwager for 1. FC Kaiserslautern (first goal on matchday 1 of 1973–74 in his 267th game)
 Highest number of games without scoring for an outfield player: 203 by Dennis Diekmeier for 1. FC Nürnberg and Hamburger SV
 Highest number of clean sheets by a goalkeeper in a season: 21 by Manuel Neuer for Bayern Munich (2015–16)
 Highest number of clean sheets by a goalkeeper: 214 by Manuel Neuer (in 466 games)
 Highest number of scored own goals: 6 by Manfred Kaltz and Nikolče Noveski
 Highest number of conceded goals by a goalkeeper: 829 by Eike Immel (in 534 games)
 Longest range from which a goal was scored: 82 metres by Moritz Stoppelkamp for SC Paderborn (matchday 4 of 2014–15)

Assists
 Highest number of assists given: 159 by Thomas Müller
 Highest number of assists in a season by a player: 21 by Thomas Müller for Bayern Munich (2019–20)
 Highest number of assists in the opening half of a season by a player: 13 by Thomas Müller for Bayern Munich (2021–22)

Championships
 Highest number of championships won overall: 11 by Thomas Müller with Bayern Munich (2009–10 and 2012–13 to 2021–22)
 Highest number of championships won as a player: 11 by Thomas Müller with Bayern Munich (2009–10 and 2012–13 to 2021–22)
 Highest number of championships won as a foreign player: 10 by David Alaba with Bayern Munich (2009–10 and 2012–13 to 2020–21) and Robert Lewandowski (2010–11 and 2011–12 with Borussia Dortmund and 2014–15 to 2021–22 with Bayern Munich)
 Highest number of championships won as a coach: 8 by Udo Lattek (1971–72 to 1973–74, 1984–85 to 1986–87 with Bayern Munich and 1975–76 and 1976–77 with Borussia Mönchengladbach)
 Highest percentage of possible championships as a coach: 100 by Pep Guardiola (3 championships in 3 seasons) and Hansi Flick (2 championship in 2 seasons)
 Highest percentage of possible championships as a coach (at least 5 seasons): 53.33 by Udo Lattek (8 championships in 15 seasons)
 Highest number of championships won as both a player and coach: 8 by Jupp Heynckes (as a player: 1970–71, 1974–75 to 1976–77 with Borussia Mönchengladbach and as a coach: 1988–89, 1989–90, 2012–13 and 2017–18 with Bayern Munich)
 Youngest age for a coach to win a championship: 34 years and 241 days by Matthias Sammer with Borussia Dortmund (2001–02)
 Oldest age for a coach to win a championship: 73 years and 3 days by Jupp Heynckes with Bayern Munich (2017–18)
 Highest number of different clubs to become champions with overall: 3 by Felix Magath (1978–79, 1981–82 and 1982–83 with Hamburger SV, 2004–05 and 2005–06 with Bayern Munich and 2008–09 with VfL Wolfsburg)
 Highest number of different clubs to become champions with as a player and coach combined: 3 by Felix Magath (as a player: 1978–79, 1981–82 and 1982–83 with Hamburger SV and as a coach: 2004–05 and 2005–06 with Bayern Munich and 2008–09 with VfL Wolfsburg)
 Highest number of different clubs to become champions with as a coach: 2 by Max Merkel (1965–66 with 1860 Munich and 1967–68 with 1. FC Nürnberg), Udo Lattek (1971–72 to 1973–74, 1984–85 to 1986–87 with Bayern Munich and 1975–76 and 1976–77 with Borussia Mönchengladbach), Hennes Weisweiler (1969–70, 1970–71 and 1974–75 with Borussia Mönchengladbach and 1977–78 with 1. FC Köln), Branko Zebec (1968–69 with Bayern Munich and 1978–79 with Hamburger SV), Otto Rehhagel (1987–88 and 1992–93 with Werder Bremen and 1997–98 with 1. FC Kaiserslautern), Ottmar Hitzfeld (1994–95 and 1995–96 with Borussia Dortmund and 1998–99 to 2000–01, 2002–03 and 2007–08 with Bayern Munich) and Felix Magath (2004–05 and 2005–06 with Bayern Munich and 2008–09 with VfL Wolfsburg)
 Highest number of different clubs to become champions with as a player: 2 by August Starek (1967–68 with 1. FC Nürnberg and 1968–69 with Bayern Munich), Ludwig Müller (1967–68 with 1. FC Nürnberg and 1969–70 and 1970–71 with Borussia Mönchengladbach), Herbert Zimmermann (1972–73 and 1973–74 with Bayern Munich and 1977–78 with 1. FC Köln), Franz Beckenbauer (1968–69, 1971–72 to 1973–74 with Bayern Munich and 1981–82 with Hamburger SV), Holger Willmer (1977–78 with 1. FC Köln and 1984–85 to 1986–87 with Bayern Munich), Karl Del'Haye (1974–75 to 1976–77 with Borussia Mönchengladbach and 1980–81 with Bayern Munich), Kurt Niedermayer (1979–80 and 1980–81 with Bayern Munich and 1983–84 with VfB Stuttgart), Ludwig Kögl (1984–85 to 1986–87, 1988–89 and 1989–90 with Bayern Munich and 1991–92 with VfB Stuttgart), Bruno Labbadia (1990–91 with 1. FC Kaiserslautern and 1993–94 with Bayern Munich), Markus Schupp (1990–91 with 1. FC Kaiserslautern and 1993–94 with Bayern Munich), Stefan Reuter (1988–89 and 1989–90 with Bayern Munich and 1994–95, 1995–96 and 2001–02 with Borussia Dortmund), Karlheinz Riedle (1987–88 with Werder Bremen and 1994–95 and 1995–96 with Borussia Dortmund), Matthias Sammer (1991–92 with VfB Stuttgart and 1994–95 and 1995–96 with Borussia Dortmund), Jürgen Kohler (1989–90 with Bayern Munich and 1995–96 and 2001–02 with Borussia Dortmund), Harald Schumacher (1977–78 with 1. FC Köln and 1995–96 with Borussia Dortmund), Andreas Brehme (1986–87 with Bayern Munich and 1997–98 with 1. FC Kaiserslautern), Andreas Buck (1991–92 with VfB Stuttgart and 1997–98 with 1. FC Kaiserslautern), Ciriaco Sforza (1997–98 with 1. FC Kaiserslautern and 2000–01 with Bayern Munich), Michael Ballack (1997–98 with 1. FC Kaiserslautern and 2002–03, 2004–05 and 2005–06 with Bayern Munich), Andreas Reinke (1997–98 with 1. FC Kaiserslautern and 2003–04 with Werder Bremen), Marco Reich (1997–98 with 1. FC Kaiserslautern and 2003–04 with Werder Bremen), Valérien Ismaël (2003–04 with Werder Bremen and 2005–06 with Bayern Munich), Markus Babbel (1996–97, 1998–99 and 1999–2000 with Bayern Munich and 2006–07 with VfB Stuttgart), Ludovic Magnin (2003–04 with Werder Bremen and 2006–07 with VfB Stuttgart), Zvjezdan Misimović (2002–03 with Bayern Munich and 2008–09 with VfL Wolfsburg), Christian Gentner (2006–07 with VfB Stuttgart and 2008–09 with VfL Wolfsburg), Mario Gómez (2006–07 with VfB Stuttgart and 2009–10 and 2012–13 with Bayern Munich), Markus Feulner (2002–03 with Bayern Munich and 2010–11 with Borussia Dortmund), Antônio da Silva (2006–07 with VfB Stuttgart and 2010–11 and 2011–12 with Borussia Dortmund), Mario Götze (2010–11 and 2011–12 with Borussia Dortmund and 2013–14 to 2015–16 with Bayern Munich), Robert Lewandowski (2010–11 and 2011–12 with Borussia Dortmund and 2014–15 to 2021–22 with Bayern Munich), Serdar Tasci (2006–07 with VfB Stuttgart and 2015–16 with Bayern Munich), Mats Hummels (2010–11 and 2011–12 with Borussia Dortmund and 2016–17 to 2018–19 with Bayern Munich) and Ivan Perišić (2011–12 with Borussia Dortmund and 2019–20 with Bayern Munich)
 Highest finishing position for a coach in a debut season (not including 1963–64): 1 by Branko Zebec with Bayern Munich (1968–69), Ernst Happel with Hamburger SV (1981–82), Franz Beckenbauer with Bayern Munich (1993–94), Louis van Gaal with Bayern Munich (2009–10), Pep Guardiola with Bayern Munich (2013–14), Carlo Ancelotti with Bayern Munich (2016–17), Niko Kovač with Bayern Munich (2018–19) and Hansi Flick with Bayern Munich (2019–20)
 Highest finishing position for a coach in a debut season never been in the Bundesliga whatsoever before (not including 1963–64): 1 by Branko Zebec with Bayern Munich (1968–69), Ernst Happel with Hamburger SV (1981–82), Louis van Gaal with Bayern Munich (2009–10), Pep Guardiola with Bayern Munich (2013–14), Carlo Ancelotti with Bayern Munich (2016–17) and Hansi Flick with Bayern Munich (2019–20)
 Highest finishing position for a foreign coach in a debut season never been active in Germany whatsoever before: 1 by Ernst Happel with Hamburger SV (1981–82), Louis van Gaal with Bayern Munich (2009–10), Pep Guardiola with Bayern Munich (2013–14) and Carlo Ancelotti with Bayern Munich (2016–17)
 Highest finishing position for a coach in a debut season with a new club (not including 1963–64): 1 by Branko Zebec with Bayern Munich (1968–69) and Hamburger SV (1978–79), Udo Lattek with Borussia Mönchengladbach (1975–76), Ernst Happel with Hamburger SV (1981–82), Franz Beckenbauer with Bayern Munich (1993–94), Giovanni Trapattoni with Bayern Munich (1996–97), Otto Rehhagel with 1. FC Kaiserslautern (1997–98), Ottmar Hitzfeld with Bayern Munich (1998–99), Felix Magath with Bayern Munich (2004–05), Louis van Gaal with Bayern Munich (2009–10), Pep Guardiola with Bayern Munich (2013–14), Carlo Ancelotti with Bayern Munich (2016–17), Niko Kovač with Bayern Munich (2018–19), Hansi Flick with Bayern Munich (2019–20) and Julian Nagelsmann with Bayern Munich (2021–22)
 Highest number of different clubs to win titles with as a coach in a debut season for the club: 2 by Branko Zebec with Bayern Munich (1968–69) and Hamburger SV (1978–79)
 Highest number of points for a coach in a debut season: 90 by Pep Guardiola with Bayern Munich (2013–14)
 Highest average of points per game for a coach: 2.52 by Pep Guardiola (257 points in 102 games (2013–2016))
 Becoming champion as a player and a coach: Helmut Benthaus (as a player: 1963–64 with 1. FC Köln and as a coach: 1983–84 with VfB Stuttgart), Jupp Heynckes (as a player: 1970–71, 1974–75 to 1976–77 with Borussia Mönchengladbach and as a coach: 1988–89, 1989–90, 2012–13 and 2017–18 with Bayern Munich), Franz Beckenbauer (as a player: 1968–69 and 1971–72 to 1973–74 with Bayern Munich and 1981–82 with Hamburger SV and as a coach: 1993–94 with Bayern Munich), Matthias Sammer (as a player: 1991–92 with VfB Stuttgart and 1994–95 and 1995–96 and as a coach: 2001–02 last three all with Borussia Dortmund), Thomas Schaaf (as a player: 1987–88 and 1992–93 and as a coach: 2003–04 all with Werder Bremen), Felix Magath (as a player: 1978–79, 1981–82 and 1982–83 with Hamburger SV and as a coach: 2004–05 and 2005–06 with Bayern Munich and 2008–09 with VfL Wolfsburg), Niko Kovač (as a player: 2002–03 with Bayern Munich and as a coach: 2018–19 with Bayern Munich) and Hansi Flick (as a player: 1985–86, 1986–87, 1988–89 and 1989–90 with Bayern Munich and as a coach: 2019–20 and 2020–21 with Bayern Munich)

Wins and losses
 Highest number of wins for a player: 315 for Manuel Neuer
 Highest number of wins for a player for one club: 302 for Thomas Müller with Bayern Munich
 Highest number of losses for a player: 221 for Bernard Dietz

Runs
 Highest number of consecutive titles, overall: 10 by Manuel Neuer and Thomas Müller (2012–13 to 2021–22) (all with Bayern Munich) (ongoing)
 Highest number of consecutive titles as a player: 10 by Manuel Neuer and Thomas Müller (2012–13 to 2021–22) (all with Bayern Munich) (ongoing)
 Highest number of consecutive titles as a coach: 3 by Udo Lattek (1971–72 to 1973–74 and 1984–85 to 1986–87), Ottmar Hitzfeld (1998–99 to 2000–01) and Pep Guardiola (2013–14 to 2015–16) (all titles with Bayern Munich)
 Highest number of different clubs to win consecutive titles with overall: 2 by August Starek with 1. FC Nürnberg (1967–68) and Bayern Munich (1968–69)
 Highest number of different clubs to win consecutive titles with as a player: 2 by August Starek with 1. FC Nürnberg (1967–68) and Bayern Munich (1968–69)
 Highest number of consecutive titles as a coach from debut season: 3 by Pep Guardiola with Bayern Munich (2013–14 to 2015–16)
 Highest number of consecutive titles as a coach from debut season with a new club: 3 by Ottmar Hitzfeld (1998–99 to 2000–01) and Pep Guardiola (2013–14 to 2015–16) (both with Bayern Munich)
 Highest number of consecutive games scoring in: 16 by Gerd Müller for Bayern Munich (23 goals from matchday 6 to 25 of 1969–70)
 Highest number of consecutive games (and matchdays) scoring in from start of the season: 11 by Robert Lewandowski for Bayern Munich (16 goals from matchday 1 to 11 of 2019–20)
 Highest number of consecutive matchdays scoring in: 11 by Robert Lewandowski for Bayern Munich (16 goals from matchday 1 to 11 of 2019–20)
 Highest number of consecutive games (and matchdays) scoring in from debut for a new club: 6 by Mohamed Zidan for Mainz 05 (6 goals from matchday 20 to 25 of 2011–12)
 Highest number of consecutive home games scoring in: 13 by Robert Lewandowski for Bayern Munich (24 goals from matchday 12 of 2020–21 to matchday 5 of 2021–22) 
 Highest number of consecutive goals scored by penalties: 17 by Hans-Jörg Butt for Hamburger SV (1999 to 2001)
 Highest number of consecutive conceded goals by penalties from first penalty against him: 18 by Sepp Maier for Bayern Munich
 Highest number of consecutive top Scorer awards: 5 by Robert Lewandowski of Bayern Munich (2017–18 to 2021–22)
 Highest number of consecutive games played: 442 by Sepp Maier (matchday 1 of 1966–67 to matchday 34 of 1978–79)
 Highest number of consecutive games played for one club: 442 by Sepp Maier for Bayern Munich (matchday 1 of 1966–67 to matchday 34 of 1978–79)
 Highest number of consecutive games played for one club, playing for no other club: 442 by Sepp Maier for Bayern Munich (matchday 1 of 1966–67 to matchday 34 of 1978–79)
 Highest number of consecutive seasons with all games played: 13 by Sepp Maier (1966–67 to 1978–79)
 Highest number of consecutive games played playing all minutes: 245 by Sepp Maier (matchday 28 of 1971–72 to matchday 34 of 1978–79)
 Highest number of consecutive games played playing all minutes by an outfield player: 241 by Manfred Binz (matchday 28 of 1986–87 to matchday 25 of 1993–94)
 Highest number of consecutive games won as a player from debut in the Bundesliga: 10 by Robert Kovač (1996–97) and Isaac Vorsah (2008–09)
 Highest number of consecutive games won as a player when scoring in them: 87 by Thomas Müller (2011 to 2019)
 Highest number of consecutive games unbeaten as a player: 56 by Jérôme Boateng (2012 to 2014)
 Highest number of consecutive games unbeaten as a player from debut in the Bundesliga: 39 by Javi Martínez (2012 to 2014)
 Highest number of consecutive games unbeaten as a coach: 36 by Ernst Happel (matchday 17 of 1981–82 to matchday 18 of 1982–83)
 Highest number of consecutive games unbeaten as a coach from debut in the Bundesliga: 28 by Pep Guardiola (matchday 1 to 28 of 2013–14)
 Highest number of consecutive games unbeaten as a coach from debut at a new club: 28 by Pep Guardiola (matchday 1 to 28 of 2013–14) with Bayern Munich
 Longest period of time unbeaten as a player: 2 years and 93 days by Jérôme Boateng (28 October 2012 to 29 January 2015)
 Highest number of consecutive games with a clean sheet by a goalkeeper: 9 by Timo Hildebrand for VfB Stuttgart (matchday 34 of 2002–03 to matchday 8 of 2003–04)
 Highest number of consecutive games with a clean sheet by a goalkeeper in a season: 8 by Timo Hildebrand for VfB Stuttgart (matchday 1 to 8 of 2003–04)
 Highest number of consecutive games with a clean sheet by a goalkeeper from start of the season: 8 by Timo Hildebrand for VfB Stuttgart (2003–04)
 Highest number of consecutive minutes without conceding by a goalkeeper: 884 by Timo Hildebrand for VfB Stuttgart (minute 76 of matchday 33 of 2002–03 to minute 59 of matchday 9 of 2003–04)
 Highest number of consecutive games with a clean sheet by a goalkeeper from debut: 4 by Timo Horn for 1. FC Köln (matchday 1 to 4 of 2014–15)
 Highest number of consecutive minutes without conceding by a goalkeeper from debut: 365 by Timo Horn for 1. FC Köln (minute 1 of matchday 1 to minute 6 of matchday 5 of 2014–15)
 Highest number of consecutive seasons as coach for one club: 15 by Thomas Schaaf for Werder Bremen (1999 to 2013)
 Highest number of consecutive appearances as coach for one club: 479 by Thomas Schaaf for Werder Bremen (1999 to 2013)
 Highest number of consecutive seasons overall: 22 by Klaus Fichtel (1965–66 to 1987–88)
 Highest number of consecutive seasons as a player: 22 by Klaus Fichtel (1965–66 to 1987–88)
 Highest number of consecutive seasons as a player for one club: 19 by Charly Körbel for Eintracht Frankfurt (1972–73 to 1990–91)
 Highest number of consecutive seasons as a player for one club, having not played for another club: 19 by Charly Körbel for Eintracht Frankfurt (1972–73 to 1990–91)
 Highest number of consecutive seasons as a coach: 15 by Otto Rehhagel for Werder Bremen (1981–82 to 1994–95) and Bayern Munich (1995 to 1996) and Thomas Schaaf for Werder Bremen (1999 to 2013)
 Highest number of consecutive seasons as a coach for one club: 15 by Thomas Schaaf for Werder Bremen (1999 to 2013)
 Highest number of consecutive seasons as a coach from league debut: 15 by Thomas Schaaf for Werder Bremen (1999 to 2013)
 Highest number of consecutive seasons as a coach for one club from league debut: 15 by Thomas Schaaf for Werder Bremen (1999 to 2013)
 Longest period of time as a coach for one club: 14 years and 5 days by Thomas Schaaf for Werder Bremen (10 May 1999 to 14 May 2013)
 Longest period of time as a coach for one club from league debut: 14 years and 5 days by Thomas Schaaf for Werder Bremen (10 May 1999 to 14 May 2013)
 Longest period of time as a coach for one club, including relegations: 15 years and 364 days by Volker Finke for SC Freiburg (1 July 1991 until 30 June 2007) (spell included 5 seasons in 2. Bundesliga)

Cards
 Highest number of cards received: 121 by Stefan Effenberg (114 yellow, 4 yellow-red and 3 red cards)
 Highest number of yellow-red cards received: 7 by Luiz Gustavo
 Highest number of straight red cards received: 5 by Jens Nowotny, Torsten Wohlert, Maurizio Gaudino, Vedad Ibišević, Fernando Meira and Jérôme Boateng 
 Highest number of red cards received overall: 8 by Jens Nowotny and Luiz Gustavo
 Highest number of red cards received in a season: 3 by Bernhard Trares (1994–95), Marcelo Bordon (2001–02), Josip Šimunić (2006–07), Aleksandar Vasoski (2006–07), Luiz Gustavo (2013–14), Granit Xhaka (2015–16) and Jean-Philippe Gbamin (2016–17)
 Highest number of yellow cards received: 114 by Stefan Effenberg
 Highest number of yellow cards received in a season: 17 by Klaus Gjasula (2019–20)
 Shortest elapsed timespan before receiving a red card: 43 seconds (after being substituted onto the pitch) by Marcel Titsch-Rivero of Eintracht Frankfurt (matchday 34 of 2010–11)
 Shortest elapsed timespan before receiving a red card, following the second booking: 12 minutes (into the game) by Mame Biram Diouf of Hannover 96 (matchday 10 of 2013–14)

Penalties
 Highest number of penalties made: 53 by Manfred Kaltz (out of 60 attempts)
 Highest number of made penalties with no miss: 16 by Hans-Joachim Abel and Max Kruse
 Highest number of missed penalties: 12 by Gerd Müller (out of 63 attempts)
 Highest number of saved penalties: 7 by Koen Casteels and Oliver Baumann

League records

Goals
 Highest number of goals scored in a season: 1,097 in 306 matches (1983–84) (3.58 goals per game)
 Lowest number of goals scored in a season: 790 in 306 matches (1989–90) (2.58 goals per game)
 Highest number of goals scored on a single matchday: 53 (matchday 32 of 1983–84)
 Lowest number of goals scored on a single matchday: 11 (matchday 26 of 1989–90 and matchday 20 of 1998–99)

Results
 Highest number of wins away on a single matchday: 7 (matchday 2 of 2010–11)
 Most frequent result: 1–1 (12% of all matches)
 Highest number of goals in a game: 12 at
 Borussia Mönchengladbach 12–0 Borussia Dortmund (matchday 34 of 1977–78)
 Borussia Dortmund 11–1 Arminia Bielefeld (1982–83)
 Bayern Munich 11–1 Borussia Dortmund (1971–72)
 Borussia Dortmund 9–3 1. FC Kaiserslautern (1963–64)
 1. FC Köln 8–4 Tennis Borussia Berlin (1976–77)

Penalties
 Highest number of missed penalties in a game: 3 at 1. FC Nürnberg vs. Eintracht Braunschweig (2–1) (2 by Braunschweig; 1 by Nürnberg) (matchday 22 of 2013–14)
 Highest number of missed penalties in a game, no penalties made: 3 at 1. FC Nürnberg vs. Eintracht Braunschweig (2–1) (2 by Braunschweig; 1 by Nürnberg) (matchday 22 of 2013–14)

Attendances
 Highest attendance in a game: 88,075 by Hertha BSC against 1. FC Köln (matchday 6 of 1969–70)
 Lowest attendance in a game: 827 by Tasmania Berlin against Borussia Mönchengladbach (matchday 19 of 1965–66)
 Highest average attendance per game in a season: 45,116 in 2011–12 
 Highest attendance in a season: 13.805.496 in 2011–12
 Highest number of sold out games in a season: 169 in 2010–11
 Highest percentage of sold out games in a season: 55.23 in 2010–11

Matches
 Most frequent match: 112 times Bayern Munich vs. Werder Bremen, or Werder Bremen vs. Bayern Munich (in 56 seasons)
 Highest number of matches played in a season: 380 (1991–92 with 20 teams competing)
 Lowest number of matches played in a season: 240 (1963–64 and 1964–65 with 16 teams competing)

Cards
 Highest number of red cards on a single matchday: 8 (matchday 3 of 2013–14)
 Highest number of cards in a game: 13 (10 yellow cards, 2 straight red cards and 1 red card for the second booking) in the game Borussia Dortmund vs. Bayern Munich (matchday 28 of 2000–01)
 Highest number of red cards in a season: 98 (1994–95)

Finances
 Highest total revenue: €3,244,330,000 (2015–16)
 Highest operational profit: €695,160,000 (2015–16)
 Highest profit: €206,183,000 (2015–16)
 Highest Transfer fee paid: €80 million for Lucas Hernandez (2019 from Atlético Madrid to Bayern Munich)
 Highest Transfer fee received: €130 million for Ousmane Dembélé (2017 from Borussia Dortmund to Barcelona)
 Highest Transfer fee in between the league: €37 million for Mario Götze (2013 from Borussia Dortmund to Bayern Munich)

Footnotes

References

External links